The  is the 40th edition of the Japan Academy Film Prize, an award presented by the Nippon Academy-Sho Association to award excellence in filmmaking. It awarded the best films of 2016 and took place on March 3, 2017 at the Grand Prince Hotel New Takanawa in Tokyo, Japan.

Winners and nominees

References

External links 
  - 

Japan Academy Film Prize
2017 in Japanese cinema
Japan Academy Film Prize
March 2017 events in Japan